Küblis railway station is a railway station in the municipality of Küblis, in the Swiss canton of Grisons. It is an intermediate stop on the Rhaetian Railway  Landquart–Davos Platz line.

Services
Küblis is served by regional trains and the S1 of the Chur S-Bahn:

 RegioExpress:
 Hourly service between Disentis/Mustér and Scuol-Tarasp.
 Hourly service between Landquart and St. Moritz.
 Hourly service between Landquart and Davos Platz.
 Regio:
 Limited service to Scuol-Tarasp.
 Limited service between Landquart and Davos Platz.

References

External links
 
 

Küblis
Railway stations in Graubünden
Rhaetian Railway stations
Railway stations in Switzerland opened in 1889